Talai Fifita (born 24 July 1962) is a former Tongan rugby union footballer player who played for the national team and East Tamaki RFC. His regular playing position was scrum-half.

Career
Fifita debuted for Tonga in a match against Fiji, in Suva, on 18 June 1983. He was later called up for the Ikale Tahi squad for the 1987 Rugby World Cup, where he played all the three pool stage matches in the tournament. In the match against Wales, in Palmerston North, Fifita scored a try which was converted by Alamoni Liavaʻa. Fifita last played for the Tonga in a match against Fiji, in Suva, on 8 June 1991, earning 11 caps and in aggregate 16 points and 4 tries scored.

References

External links

1962 births
Living people
Tongan rugby union players
Tonga international rugby union players
Rugby union scrum-halves